Leyland Brothers World was an Australian theme park at North Arm Cove on the Mid North Coast of New South Wales that opened in 1990 and closed in 1992. Sold to new owners later that same year, as of  the park continues to operate as the Great Aussie Bush Camp.

History

In November 1990, Leyland Brothers World was opened by Mal and Mike Leyland, documentary filmmakers who had gained fame with their films about the Australian outback as well as the television series Ask the Leyland Brothers. The Leylands had sought to diversify their business interests by leveraging their name in the hospitality and tourism sector. The park was set on a 40-hectare property on the Pacific Highway at North Arm Cove on the Mid North Coast of New South Wales. It included a 1/40 scale replica of Uluru, as well as amusement rides, a playground, a roadhouse, museum, a 1.8 610mm gauge circular railway and a bush camp with a capacity to host 144 guests.

The park had an estimated annual attendance of about 400,000 people, with 10,000 students attending the bush camp. Despite this, in July 1992, BDO Nelson was appointed receiver and manager of the park after the Leyland brothers failed to meet their loan commitments to the Commonwealth Bank. In a 1997 article in the Sunday Age, Mike Leyland said that the initial $1 million loan had blown out due to rain during construction and was further compounded by a 27% interest rate. The failure of the park left the brothers bankrupt and led to a personal and professional rift between them that dissolved their 31 year filmmaking partnership. In 2015, Mal Leyland told Australian Story that "in hindsight, Leyland Brothers World was a huge mistake, the biggest mistake we ever made."

The theme park was sold to new owners by the receiver for $800,000 in November 1992, and as of  continues to operate as the Great Aussie Bush Camp. The roadhouse and Uluru replica was destroyed by fire on 31 July 2018.

References

Amusement parks in New South Wales
Amusement parks opened in 1990
Amusement parks closed in 1992
Defunct amusement parks in Australia
1990 establishments in Australia
1992 disestablishments in Australia